Snack mix is a subset of snack foods consisting of multiple snack items. Popular snack mixes are as follows:

Bridge mix – Nuts, raisins (or other dried fruit), and candy, all covered in chocolate.
Chex Mix – Rice, corn and/or wheat Chex, peanuts, pretzels, and usually bagel chips. Chex cereal was introduced in 1937 by Ralston Purina.
Gardetto's – Bread sticks, rye chips, and pretzels made by General Mills, owner of the similar Chex Mix.
Munchies – A prepackaged snack mix made by and with Frito-Lay products such as Doritos, Cheetos, Rold Gold Pretzels, and Sun Chips.
Trail mix – These generally contain granola, raisins, nuts, and chocolate chips or M&M's Popular brands include Planter’s Nuts And Chocolate Trail Mix (from KraftHeinz), and Kirkland Signature Trail Mix (from Costco Wholesale).
Tropical Fruit Snack Mix – Dried pineapples, dried papayas, dried mangos, dried apples, dried bananas and raisins.
Bombay mix, also known by other names (saloonia, chiwda, chevdo, bhuso, chevda, or chivdo), a spicy mix of dry ingredients originating in Indian cuisine
Tex Mex mix, including nuts, dried chili, and crunchy corn-based sticks

See also
 List of snack foods
 List of Indian snack foods
 Snacking

References

Snack foods